1st Kings was an electoral district in the Canadian province of Prince Edward Island, which elected two members to the Legislative Assembly of Prince Edward Island from 1873 to 1993.

The district comprised the easternmost portion of Kings County. It was abolished in 1996.

MLAs

Dual Member

Assemblyman-Councillor

References

Kings 1
1873 establishments in Prince Edward Island
1996 disestablishments in Prince Edward Island